Rock It to the Moon is the debut album by English rock group Electrelane. It was released on compact disc in the UK in 2001 by Let's Rock!, and issued by Mr. Lady Records in the US in 2002. Too Pure, the record label Electrelane signed with for their follow up album, The Power Out (2004), reissued  Rock It to the Moon in 2005.

The album was mostly instrumental. Verity Susman explained, "Way way back, when we first started, we always had a lot of singing. But it never worked that well. When we did instrumental it was always more interesting. More completely we felt like we were doing something good, while the songs with the singing ended up quite bog-standard, boring, not very interesting." NME rated the album an 8 out of 10, saying Rock It to the Moon was "just the way a debut album should be... utterly focused [and] stripped of all extraneous flab."

Track listing
 "The Invisible Dog" (Debbie Ball, Rachel Dalley, Emma Gaze, Verity Susman) – 4:20
 "Long Dark" (Ball, Mia Clarke, Dalley, Gaze, Susman) – 9:20
 "Gabriel" (Ball, Dalley, Gaze, Susman) – 4:25
 "Film Music" (Ball, Gaze, Tracy Houdek, Rupert Noble, Susman) – 3:57
 "Blue Straggler" (Ball, Dalley, Gaze, Susman) – 6:49
 "Many Peaks" (Ball, Dalley, Gaze, Susman) – 4:01
 "Le Song" (Ball, Dalley, Gaze, Susman) – 3:25
 "Spartakiade" (Ball, Dalley, Gaze, Susman) – 1:41
 "U.O.R." (Ball, Gaze, Noble, Susman) – 8:42
 "The Boat" (Dalley) – 4:25
 "Mother" (Clarke, Dalley, Gaze, Susman) – 22:24

Personnel
Verity Susman – clarinet, guitar, piano, glockenspiel, saxophone, vocals, handclapping, Farfisa organ, string arrangements
Emma Gaze – percussion, drums, tambourine, vocals, handclapping, radio
Rachel Dalley – bass, conga, vocals
Mia Clarke – guitar
Katie Spafford – cello
Roland Susman – trumpet
Marianne Vaughan – violin
Polly Benians – handclapping
Christelle Breedt – handclapping
Electrelane – producer, mixing
Jake Rousham – engineer
Matthew Ryan – producer, engineer, mixing
Sarah Feltham Chesshire - Viola

Release history

References

2001 albums
Electrelane albums